The 1987 Major League Baseball postseason was the playoff tournament of Major League Baseball for the 1987 season. The winners of each division advance to the postseason and face each other in a League Championship Series to determine the pennant winners that face each other in the World Series.

In the American League, the Detroit Tigers were making their second appearance in the past five years, and the Minnesota Twins made their first postseason appearance since 1970. In the National League, the San Francisco Giants returned to the postseason for the first time since 1971, and the St. Louis Cardinals were making their third appearance in the last six years.

The playoffs began on October 6, 1987, and concluded on October 25, 1987, with the Twins defeating the Cardinals in seven games in the 1987 World Series. It was the Twins' first title in Minnesota and their first since 1924, when they were known as the Washington Senators.

Playoff seeds
The following teams qualified for the postseason:

American League
 Detroit Tigers - 98–64, Clinched AL East
 Minnesota Twins - 85–77, Clinched AL West

National League
 St. Louis Cardinals - 95–67, Clinched NL East
 San Francisco Giants - 90–72, Clinched NL West

Playoff bracket

American League Championship Series

Minnesota Twins vs. Detroit Tigers

In an unexpected outcome, the Twins shockingly upset the MLB-best Tigers in five quick games and made their first World Series since 1965 (effectively denying a rematch of the 1968 World Series in the process).

The Twins held off a late comeback by the Tigers to win Game 1, 8-5. The Twins convincingly took Game 2 by three runs to go up 2-0 in the series. When the series moved back to Detroit for Game 3, the Tigers blew a 5-0 lead to the Twins in the top of the seventh as Minnesota regained the lead, putting the Tigers in danger of falling behind 3-0 in the series. But the Tigers would ultimately prevail, as Pat Sheridan hit a two-run home run to put the Tigers ahead for good, securing the victory and putting the Tigers on the board in the series. However, the Twins would narrowly prevail in Game 4, and in Game 5, the Twins won by four runs to secure the pennant. Game 5 was also the last postseason game ever played at Tiger Stadium. This was the last time the Tigers faced a team from their current division (the American League Central) in the postseason.

After the series loss, the Tigers would not return to the postseason again until 2006, when they won the AL pennant over the Oakland Athletics in a sweep.

The Twins would win their next pennant in 1991, against the Toronto Blue Jays in five games.

National League Championship Series

St. Louis Cardinals vs. San Francisco Giants 

This was the first postseason meeting between the Cardinals and Giants. The Cardinals edged out the Giants in seven games, capped off by two shutouts in Games 6 and 7, to reach their third World Series appearance in the last six years (in the process denying a rematch of the 1924 and 1933 World Series).

The Cardinals took Game 1 by two runs. In Game 2, the Giants evened the series with a 5-0 victory as Dave Dravecky pitched a complete game shutout. In San Francisco for Game 3, the Giants had a 4-0 lead after five innings of play, but the Cardinals came back to win, going on a 6-1 run over the course of the last four innings to win and take a 2-1 series lead. Mike Krukow pitched another complete game for the Giants as they won 4-2 to even the series. The Giants won 6-3 in Game 5 to take a 3-2 series lead headed back to St. Louis. John Tudor pitched eight solid shutout innings as the Cardinals won 1-0 to force a seventh game. Danny Cox pitched a complete game shutout for the Cardinals as they won Game 7, 6-0, to secure the pennant.

This was the last time the Cardinals won the NL pennant until 2004. The Giants would return to the NLCS two years later, where they would defeat the Chicago Cubs in five games to reach the World Series.

The Cardinals and Giants would play each other three more times in the NLCS, in 2002, 2012, and 2014, with the Giants winning all three meetings.

1987 World Series

Minnesota Twins (AL) vs. St. Louis Cardinals (NL) 

This was the first World Series to feature games played indoors. It was also the third consecutive World Series to go the full seven games. In the first World Series in which neither team won a road game, the Twins edged out the Cardinals in seven games to win their first World Series title in Minnesota. Overall, it was their first title since 1924 World Series, when the team was still known as the Washington Senators. 

In Game 1, Frank Viola pitched a complete game as the Twins blew out the Cardinals, 10-1. Game 1 was one of the loudest in World Series history, as crowd noise exceeded 110 decibels SPL. The Twins held off a late comeback by the Cardinals as they won Game 2, 8-4, to go up 2-0 in the series headed to St. Louis. In Game 3, the Cardinals overcame a late Twins lead to win 3-1, with John Tudor pitching eight solid innings for the win. The Cardinals blew out the Twins in Game 4 to even the series. Todd Worrell held off a late rally by the Twins in Game 5 as the Cardinals won, 4-2, now one win away from their second title in six years. The Cardinals tied a World Series record for stolen bases with five in Game 5, matching the 1907 Chicago Cubs. The Cardinals' lead would not hold as the series shifted back to Minneapolis, however. The Twins blew out the Cardinals in Game 6, 11-5, to force a seventh game. Viola pitched eight solid innings in Game 7 as the Twins came back to win by a 4-2 score, securing the title.

With the Twins winning Game 7 in the regulation nine innings, the 1987 World Series was the first in which no games needed the bottom of the ninth inning. No other World Series since then has had that happen, as the two other Fall Classics in which the home team won every game—1991 and 2001—both included extra inning games and walk-off wins in the bottom of the ninth. 

This was the first major league championship won by a team from the Minneapolis-St. Paul metropolitan area since 1954, when the then-Minneapolis Lakers won the NBA Finals to complete a three-peat.

The Twins would return to the World Series four years later, where they defeated the Atlanta Braves in seven games. This would be the last postseason appearance for the Cardinals until 1996, and they wouldn't return to the World Series again until 2004, where they were swept by the Boston Red Sox. The Cardinals would win their next championship in 2006 against the Detroit Tigers in five games.

References

External links
 League Baseball Standings & Expanded Standings - 1987

 
Major League Baseball postseason